Traleg Kyabgon Rinpoche (1955–2012) was the ninth incarnation of the Traleg tulku line, a line of high lamas in the Kagyu lineage of Vajrayana. He was a pioneer in bringing Tibetan Buddhism to Australia.

Biography

Traleg Rinpoche was born in 1955 in Kham (Eastern Tibet), and two years later was recognized by HH 16th Gyalwa Karmapa as the ninth incarnation of the Traleg Tulkus and enthroned as the Abbot of the Thrangu Monastery. He was taken to safety in India during the 1959 Chinese Communists invasion of Tibet. There he was given a traditional tulku education, supplemented by five years of schooling at Sanskrit University in Varanasi, India. He lived and studied for several years at Rumtek Monastery in Sikkim, the main seat in exile of the Kagyu Lineage.  He died on July 24, 2012 in Melbourne, Australia.

Teaching in the West
In 1980 Rinpoche transmitted the Dharma in Australia where he established Kagyu E-vam Buddhist Institute in Melbourne. He relinquished his monastic vows, became a lay teacher and married. He earned a master's degree in Comparative Philosophy from La Trobe University. In 1989, he taught extensively at Karma Triyana Dharmachakra, visiting the North American affiliates of HH Gyalwa Karmapa. In 2004 he established the Evam Institute in New York in Chatham, NY. He also taught extensively in the Karma Thegsum Choling network of the Karmapa's centers and at Shambhala Buddhist centers. His wife, Felicity Lodro, is also an active dharma teacher.

See also
Thrangu Rinpoche
Nalandabodhi
Shambhala Buddhism

Bibliography
Luminous Bliss: self realisation through meditation, by Traleg Kyabgon, Lothian Books (2003), 
The Benevolent Mind, by Traleg Kyabgon, Zhi-sil Cho-kyi Gha-Tsal Publications (2003), 
The Essence of Buddhism, by Traleg Kyabgon, Shambhala (2001), 
Mind at Ease, by Traleg Kyabgon, Shambhala (2004), 
The Practice of Lojong, by Traleg Kyabgon, Shambhala (2007), 
The Influence of Yogacara on Mahamudra, by Traleg Kyabgon, KTD Publications (2010), 
The Ninth Karmapa, Wanchuk Dorje’s Ocean of Certainty, by Traleg Kyabgon, KTD Publications (2011), 
The Essence of Buddhism: An Introduction to Its Philosophy and Practice, by Traleg Kyabgon, Shambhala; Reissue edition (2014), 
Karma: What It Is, What It Isn't, Why It Matters, by Traleg Kyabgon, Shambhala (2015), 
Moonbeams of Mahamudra: The Classic Meditation Manual, Traleg Kyabgon (translator), Shogam Publications (2016),

References

External links
Traleg Kyabgon Rinpoche Homepage
The Evam Institute in New York homepage
The Kagyu E-Vam Institute in Melbourne
An introduction by Khenpo Karthar Rinpoche
An Australian Buddhist magazine established by Traleg Rinpoche

Lamas
Buddhism in Australia
Tibetan Buddhists from Tibet
Rinpoches
1955 births
2012 deaths
Chinese emigrants to Australia
20th-century Buddhists
21st-century Buddhists
Australian people of Tibetan descent